The following is a list of the MTV Europe Music Award winners and nominees for Best Africa, Middle East and India Act.

2010s

See also 
 MTV VMA International Viewer's Choice Award for MTV India
 MTV Immies
 MTV Africa Music Awards

MTV Europe Music Awards
African music awards
Indian music awards
Middle Eastern culture
Arab culture
Mass media in the Middle East
Awards established in 2011